Phatsorn Jaksuninkorn (formerly Sangwan Jaksunin; born 10 December 1984 in Bangkok) is a track and field sprint athlete who competes internationally for Thailand.

Jaksunin represented Thailand at the 2008 Summer Olympics in Beijing. She competed at the 4x100 metres relay together with Orranut Klomdee, Jutamass Thavoncharoen and Nongnuch Sanrat. In their first round heat they placed fifth in a time of 44.38 seconds was the eleventh time overall out of sixteen participating nations. With this result they failed to qualify for the final.

Achievements

References

External links
 
 
 

1984 births
Living people
Phatsorn Jaksuninkorn
Phatsorn Jaksuninkorn
Athletes (track and field) at the 2008 Summer Olympics
Phatsorn Jaksuninkorn
Asian Games medalists in athletics (track and field)
Athletes (track and field) at the 2006 Asian Games
Athletes (track and field) at the 2010 Asian Games
Athletes (track and field) at the 2014 Asian Games
Universiade medalists in athletics (track and field)
Phatsorn Jaksuninkorn
Southeast Asian Games medalists in athletics
Phatsorn Jaksuninkorn
Medalists at the 2010 Asian Games
Competitors at the 2005 Southeast Asian Games
Competitors at the 2007 Southeast Asian Games
Competitors at the 2009 Southeast Asian Games
Competitors at the 2015 Southeast Asian Games
Phatsorn Jaksuninkorn
Phatsorn Jaksuninkorn